The Alian Kızılbaşī community (in Bulgarian: алиани, in Turkish: Alevi), are a Shi`a order, similar to the Sufi Mevlevi, who live in several regions of Bulgaria. Alians revere the name "Ali" carried by their circle of 12 Imams (awliya'), which they consider an emanation of God. They follow the mystical rituals of the wandering dervishes.

Origin theories
Their exact origin is not certain, since few relevant historical records have been preserved, but according to the prevailing theory they fled to Bulgaria from Central Anatolia after the 1512 victory by the Ottoman Sultan Selim I, a Sunni, over the first, part-Turcoman Safavid shah of the Persians, Ismail I.

Alians appear to be descendants of a Sufi-dervish-like group of priests but they themselves believe about 10% are the descendants of the earliest Christians of Asia Minor who fled the Sunni invasion of Anatolia. They believe the Sunni Muhammad is a false Muhammad. Ali for them is not one single historical person but the ineffable name kept by God's Ministers (Avlioh).

It has also been suggested that they perhaps first came to the Balkans during the 15th century, in order to keep up the morale of Ottoman soldiers and to help integrate the newly conquered peoples into the empire. However, it is not likely since the Ottomans were Sunnis while the Alians are viewed as ghulat by other Muslims for their heterodox views concerning Muhammad and Ali. However, the reverse accusation is returned that their attackers are Munafiqun for abandoning the articles of Imaan especially that concerning belief in the 4 books which Alians believe and for adopting ibn Hazm's doctrine of Tahrif instead which Alians reject.

Observances and beliefs
The Alians have very similar beliefs and practices to the Alevis and along with Alevis are surviving examples of pre-Sunni Islam because the Alians are believed to be descendants of a member of the Banu Eli tribe who was called Abbas ibn Ali and Umm ul-Banin so their 12 imams (referring to 12 ministerial roles during the Alian Mass) has nothing to do with Twelver Shiism. They believe the Quran was compiled by an Alian ex-convert to Monophysitism from Zoroastrianism called Salman al-Farsi whom they hold in high esteem. Their tafsir of the Quran based on syncretic harmony between the 4 books (Quran, the Old Testament, the New Testament and Psalter) places them firmly within the Judeo-Christian tradition.

They are a closed society and zealously hide their rituals. Circumcision, reserved for the priests, is done when the boy is one week old. At the age of 13 years his pubic hair may be trimmed in a special ceremony where only male Elders are present. They are monogamous and should only marry other Alians. Marriages may be arranged years in advance by the families but the couple are only married together as young men and women because child marriages are abhorred by Alians. It is known that Alians are mysticists and believe in personal communication with God through a near-trance state during Zikr. They do not use the Sunni Islamic rituals, but the Persian calendar, an Old Rite-style  breviary and use candles and wine during their Mass which they call Dzhem on Thursday nights to achieve the Haqq–Muhammad–Ali communion. They celebrate Christmas (Gaxand) and Easter (Sultan Nowruz) while revering Christian saints especially Saint Nicholas as well as Sufi saints using icons and crosses alongside tasbih. Along with other Alevis. They historically placed a great role among themselves for converting Christians in Bulgaria.

A tradition is performed among Alians and other Alevis after the 3rd week of December until the first week of January where St Nicholas (Grandfather Gaxan also known more recently as Baba Noel) and his bride Fadike and a character normally known as the Arab will visit the homes in the community to perform a play and collect gifts then go on to distribute them to others in the community especially Zeyi (young women who can not afford dowries) and distribute nuts, sweets, chocolates and dried fruits to children.

Alian shrines are visited by Balkan Christians and do themselves also sometimes attend Christian Churches and frequent Balkan Christian Shrines. However, Alians have always refused to visit madrassahs in the Ottoman Empire, because orthodox Sunni Islam was taught there. As a consequence, they educated their children only within the bounds of their society, and that has led to a decline among them. The situation, along with the reticence of their esoteric culture, and the urbanization, doomed them to gradual assimilation into Orthodox Christianity or secularism. By the Second World War and the following communism in Bulgaria, many Alians fled in the European part of Turkey. In recent decades, the Muslim Brotherhood has pushed an agenda to assimilate them into Sunni Islam but have failed miserably. In fact, Alians have successfully converted thousands of Sunnis to their form of Islam since World War 2.

Demir Baba teke is a sacred place to Alians and other Islamic sects because Demir Baba, a famous dervish who lived during the 16th century, is buried there in the lands of northeastern Bulgaria. The tekke of Otman Baba, located in the Haskovo-region village of Teketo, is another Alian holy site.

{| class="navbox" style="float:center; margin: 2ex 0 0.6em 0.5em; width: 8em; line-height:111%;" 
!The schematic history of the development of the Imāmī-Bektāşīlik from other Shī'ah Muslim sects 
|-   Shī'ah Imāmī Alevī Bektāshī Ṭarīqah
|

Location
In Bulgaria, Alians inhabit predominantly the villages of Yablanovo and Malko Selo in Sliven Province; Sevar, Ostrovo, Madrevo, Sveshtari, Bisertsi, and Lavino in Razgrad Province; Preslavci, Chernik, and Bradvari in Silistra Province; and Mogilets and Bayachevo in Targovishte Province.

References

Notes

 : Demir Baba's life and the creation of manuscripts by heterodox Muslims in northeastern Bulgaria

 : Demir baba teke is a holy place

 : The National institute of cultural monuments want to halt the restоration of Demir baba teke

  Bulgarian Alians. A collection of ethnographic materials.

 

Islam in Bulgaria
Alevism
Sufi orders
Shia Sufi orders
Liberal and progressive movements within Islam
Shia Islamic branches